Cipher Syntax is an album by Strata Institute, an M-Base group led by saxophonists Greg Osby and Steve Coleman, recorded in 1988 and released on the JMT label.

Reception
The AllMusic review by Michael G. Nastos states, "An acquired taste, but still excellent".

Track listing
All compositions by Steve Coleman except as indicated
 "Slang" - 9:18
 "Bed Stuy" - 7:08
 "Turn of Events" (Greg Osby) - 3:23
 "Decrepidus" (Osby) - 3:49
 "Ihgnat Down" (Strata Institute) - 2:23
 "Micro-Move" - 4:17
 "Wild" - 3:04
 "Humantic" (Osby) - 7:19
 "Abacus" - 7:28
 "Ihgnat" (Strata Institute) - 3:27

Personnel
Steve Coleman - alto saxophone
Greg Osby - alto saxophone, soprano saxophone
David Gilmore - electric guitar (tracks 1-3, 5 & 8-10)
Bob Hurst - acoustic bass (tracks 1-5 & 7-10)
Marvin "Smitty" Smith (tracks 1-3, 5 & 7-10), Tani Tabbal (tracks 1, 4, 8 & 9) - drums

References 

1989 albums
Greg Osby albums
Steve Coleman albums
JMT Records albums
Winter & Winter Records albums